Boston is an unincorporated community straddling Culpeper County and Rappahannock County, Virginia, United States.

The George L. Carder House, which is located in nearby Castleton, Virginia, was added to the National Register of Historic Places in 1991.

Notes

Unincorporated communities in Virginia
Unincorporated communities in Culpeper County, Virginia

Unincorporated communities in Rappahannock County, Virginia